Bleak House is a BBC television drama first broadcast in 1985. The serial was adapted by Arthur Hopcraft from the Charles Dickens novel Bleak House (1853).

The series was the second adaptation of Bleak House by the BBC (the first being in 1959). It ran for eight episodes and starred Diana Rigg as Lady Dedlock, with Denholm Elliott in the role of John Jarndyce.

In the United States, the series ran under the Masterpiece Theatre series umbrella.

A notable plot omission in this version is the story of Caddy Jellyby and the Turveydrop family.

As opposed to the standard of videotape for studio-based scenes and film for location-based scenes, the series was shot entirely on 16mm colour film.

Cast
Robin Bailey – Sir Leicester Dedlock
Suzanne Burden – Esther Summerson
Denholm Elliott – John Jarndyce
Philip Franks – Richard Carstone
Lucy Hornak – Ada Clare
T. P. McKenna – Harold Skimpole
Chris Pitt – Jo
Diana Rigg – Lady Dedlock
Sylvia Coleridge – Miss Flite
Graham Crowden – Lord Chancellor
Peter Vaughan – Tulkinghorn
Bernard Hepton – Krook
Jonathan Moore – William Guppy
Frank Windsor – Gridley
Brian Deacon – Allan Woodcourt
Robert Urquhart – Laurence Boythorn
Sam Kelly – Mr. Snagsby
Dave King – Sergeant George
Pamela Merrick – Hortense
Ian Hogg – Inspector Bucket
Charlie Drake – Smallweed
Eileen Davies – Judy Smallweed
Donald Sumpter – 'Nemo'
Gabrielle Daye – Mrs. Rouncewell
Harry Jones – Phil Squod
Colin Jeavons – Vholes
Cathy Murphy – Housemaid
Arthur Hewlett – Waggoner
Anne Reid – Mrs. Bagnet
Anthony Roye – Kenge
George Sewell – Ironmaster Rouncewell
Guy Standeven – Bagnet
Stella Tanner – Mrs. Chadband
Malcolm Terris – Reverend Chadband
Paul Venables – Wat Rouncewell
John Oliver – Felix Pardiggle
Bob Goody - Barrister
Cyril Appleton - Second Barrister

See also
Bleak House
Bleak House (1959 TV serial)
Bleak House (2005 TV serial)

References

External links

1985 British television series debuts
1985 British television series endings
1980s British drama television series
BBC television dramas
Films based on works by Charles Dickens
Television shows based on works by Charles Dickens
Television series set in the 1850s
1980s British television miniseries
English-language television shows
Television shows set in England
Works based on Bleak House